L. Baird Tipson is an American academic and college administrator.

Education 
Tipson graduated from The Hill School in 1961. He earned an A.B. degree from Princeton University in 1965 and a Ph.D. in religious studies from Yale University in 1972.

Career 
After an initial career as a professor of religion at the University of Virginia and Central Michigan University, Tipson entered academic administration. He served as Provost at Gettysburg College from 1987 to 1995. He served as president of Wittenberg University from 1995 to 2004 and Washington College from 2004 to 2010. He retired to Gettysburg, Pennsylvania in 2010 and resumed teaching and scholarly research as an adjunct professor at Gettysburg College.

Tipson's extensive study of early Protestantism in Connecticut, Hartford Puritanism - Thomas Hooker, Samuel Stone, and Their Terrifying God, was published by Oxford University Press in 2015.  His second book, Inward Baptism : The Theological Origins of Evangelism,  was published in 2020 by the same press.

References

External links
Washington College
North Coast Athletic Conference Bios

Living people
Year of birth missing (living people)
Presidents of Washington College
Princeton University alumni
Yale University alumni
Gettysburg College faculty
The Hill School alumni